was a district located in Nagasaki Prefecture, Japan.

Minamitakaki District is now equivalent to the cities of Shimabara, Unzen, and Minami-Shimabara.

As of 2003, the district had an estimated population of 117,639 and a density of 293.97 persons per km2. The total area was 400.18 km2.

Former towns and villages
 Aino
 Ariake
 Arie
 Azuma
 Chijiwa
 Fukae
 Futsu
 Kazusa
 Kita-Arima
 Kuchinotsu
 Kunimi
 Minami-Arima
 Minami-Kushiyama
 Mizuho
 Nishi-Arie
 Obama

Mergers
 On October 11, 2005 - the towns of Aino, Azuma, Chijiwa, Kunimi, Minami-Kushiyama, Mizuho and Obama were merged to create the city of Unzen.
 On January 1, 2006 - the town of Ariake were merged into the expanded city of Shimabara.
 On March 31, 2006 - the towns of Arie, Fukae, Futsu, Kazusa, Kita-Arima, Kuchinotsu, Minami-Arima and Nishi-Arie were merged to create the city of Minami-Shimabara. Minamitakaki District was dissolved as a result of this merger.

Former districts of Nagasaki Prefecture